Harrison College was a private for-profit college based in Indianapolis, Indiana, with 11 campuses in Indiana, Ohio, and North Carolina.  The college was founded as Indiana Business College in 1902 in Marion, Indiana.  Harrison graduated more than 80,000 students, with associate degrees, bachelor's degrees and certificates in more than 30 programs across six schools of study: business, nursing, health sciences, information technology, veterinary technology and culinary arts at The Chef's Academy at Harrison College. Harrison was accredited by the Accrediting Bureau of Health Education Schools (ABHES) and its baccalaureate nursing degree programs were accredited by the Commission on Collegiate Nursing Education. On September 14, 2018, an open letter was published to Harrison College's website explaining that all campuses would close permanently on September 16, 2018, except for The Chef's Academy, which would stay open until the term ended on October 14, 2018.

References

External links

 
Defunct private universities and colleges in Indiana
Universities and colleges in Indianapolis
Education in Delaware County, Indiana
Educational institutions established in 1902
American companies established in 1902
Former for-profit universities and colleges in the United States
Defunct companies based in Indianapolis
Vocational education in the United States
Education in Terre Haute, Indiana
1902 establishments in Indiana
2018 disestablishments in Indiana
Educational institutions disestablished in 2018
American companies disestablished in 2018

pl:Harrison College